Irish Whip Wrestling (IWW) is an Irish-owned independent professional wrestling promotion established in January 2002. The company is named after a wrestling move called the 'Irish Whip'. IWW runs shows Nationally throughout the whole of Ireland, both in The Republic and Northern Ireland. The company has appeared on numerous terrestrial and digital channels and had a weekly show called WHIPLASH TV on The Wrestling Channel, which aired from 2005–2006 throughout the UK and Ireland.

They also released over a Dozen VHS tapes & DVDs of original IWW content. These were shipped to over 17 countries worldwide on 5 continents.

Irish Whip Wrestling was the first ever modern day wrestling promotion in Ireland & the first to tour nationally with former WWE, WCW, ECW & Japanese wrestlers. They were the first wrestling company in Ireland to produce Irish wrestling VHS & DVD content & the first and only Irish promotion to have a wrestling television show aired in Ireland.

History

Early years (2002–2004)
Irish Whip Wrestling (IWW) ran its first two shows in June 2002 in the National Basketball Arena in Tallaght, which featured wrestler Tatanka. After these two shows, IWW returned to the ESB National Basketball Arena on October 9 for a show that was headlined by Jake "The Snake" Roberts.

IWW continued to promote shows around Ireland through 2003 and 2004. On December 2, 2004, IWW held a show in Lucan, Dublin, and the main event featured an FWA British Heavyweight Championship match in which Alex Shane pinned Sheamus O'Shaunessy. Also in 2004, IWW opened up their 'Lock-up' training school in Dublin. Trainers at this school have included Blake Norton, "Middleman" Lee Butler and "The Pukka One" Darren Burridge. The training school has also been host to the company's Gym Wars shows which gives trainees a chance to show their skills to IWW management and to a crowd.

Growth (2005–2007)

On March 20, 2005 IWW presented its first-ever SuperShow, held in the SFX City Theatre in Dublin. On March 28, O'Shaunessy was crowned the first-ever IWW International Heavyweight Champion when he defeated Darren Burridge in the tournament final. American wrestler D'Lo Brown unseated O'Shaunessy as IWW Champion at D-Day on May 20th, 2005. Brown reigned for 126 days, before dropping the title back to O'Shaunessy at a Main Event Wrestling Event in Newcastle, England.

Also in 2005, IWW got its own TV show called Whiplash TV, which was broadcast on The Wrestling Channel on Sky Digital. The show ran for two seasons. Throughout May and June 2006, IWW taped several episodes of its Whiplash TV show in the Laughter Lounge in Dublin City. In 2006, IWW ran shows in cities across Ireland. From August to October 2006, the first ever King of the Gym tournament was held over the course of four Gym Wars events. The key IWW feud of this period was between O'Shaunessy and Drew Galloway who battled in a series of gimmick matches (Lumberjack, Two-Out-of-Three Falls, Last Man Standing) between January and August 2006 until Galloway successfully defeated O'Shaunessy to win the IWW title and the end their rivalry.

At the beginning of 2007, the IWW Zero Gravity Championship was created, and a tournament was held to crown the first champion. The 12-man tournament included wrestlers from seven countries.

In March 2017, IWW held its second SuperShow, and in the main event, Vic Viper defeated Christopher Daniels to retain the IWW International Heavyweight Championship. On July 6, IWW returned to the Forum in Waterford for its Global Impact show, which was taped for DVD sales. The match between the Ballymun Bruiser and Doug Williams was featured on TV3's Diary of a Sportstar program.

In late October 2007, it ran 14 shows between the October 19 and 28. Several matches on the tour were taped for the International Hits, Vol. 1 DVD.

Return of Gym Wars; Memorial Tournament & Tours (2008–2019)
On June 1, 2008 Gym Wars returned after a 10-month absence. Later that month, IWW returned to the National Basketball Arena in Tallaght, Dublin for the first time in six years. All the matches were taped for IWW's television show on Buzz TV.

IWW continued running shows in 2011. Around this time they branched into fundraisers, festival events and summer circuit shows.

From 2011 onward IWW focused on exhibiting Irish talent. The roster of wrestlers from all over the world slimmed down. Touring performers from Canada, America, the UK and Europe were still used.

Presently, Irish Whip tours nationally doing the festival & agricultural show circuit. Approximately 30 shows a year in 2019, compared to its peak of 60+ a year at one time.

Hibernation 
Due to the Global pandemic of the Covid-19 Virus, Irish Whip Wrestling went into Hibernation in 2020 & 2021.

Championships

Current champions

IWW International Heavyweight Championship

The IWW International Heavyweight Championship is the primary title for IWW. The championship was created in 2005. A tournament was held in Naas, Co. Kildare in March 2005 to crown the first ever champion. The former champion Mandrake was the longest reigning champion in history of the company. On February 5, 2010, the Zero Gravity Title was unified with it and it became known as the Irish Whip Wrestling Unified Heavyweight Championship. On April 30, 2011, The Supermodel defeated Mandrake for the IWW International Heavyweight championship. The Zero Gravity championship was un-unified with the International Heavyweight Championship after this match.

IWW Zero Gravity Championship

The IWW Zero Gravity Championship is professional wrestling championship in IWW. The championship was created in early 2007. The tournament to crown the inaugural champion was a 12-man tournament including wrestlers from seven countries. On February 5, 2010 it was unified with the IWW International Heavyweight Championship and retired. It was later reactivated, after Mandrake lost the IWW International Heavyweight Championship.

King of the Gym winners
2006: Wayne Daly
2007: Brother Skelly
2008: Keith Connolly

Danno Mahony Tournament winners
 2008: Mandrake
 2009: The Supermodel
 2010: Mandrake
 2011: Captain Rooney

Alumni

 Tyson Kidd
 Go Shiozaki
 Taiji Ishimori
 Vampiro
 Tyson T-Bone
 Matt Striker
 Finn Balor
 Drew McIntyre
 Michael Kovac
 Bobby Fish
 Joe E. Legend
 Sami Zayn
 Jonny Storm
 Vid Vain
 Matt Cross
 Jody Fleisch
 Loinheart
 Fast Eddie
 Bruce Prichard
 P. N. News
 Robbie Brookside
 Mark Haskins
 Steve Lynsky
 Xavier
 Dave Mastiff
 Pineapple Pete
 Mikey Batts
 The Green Phantom
 CJ Banks
 April Hunter
 Bad Bones
 Frank 'Chic' Cullen
 Frank 'Midge' Casey
 Pat Barrett
 Wade Barrett
 Balls Mahoney
 Big Vito
 Jezabel
 Jake Roberts
 Kid Kash
 Tracy Smothers 
 Doug Basham
 Raven
 Rene Dupree
 Eugene
 Christopher Daniels
 Andy Boy Simmonz
 Kevin Thorn
 A.J. Styles
 Pierre Carl Ouellet
 Lupin Matsutani
 Darryl Sharma
 Dru Onyx
 Kenny Lush
 Joel Redman
 Jonathan Gresham
 Nigel McGuinness
 Kevin Thorne
 Pierre Marceaux
 Chris Raaber
 Scott Conway
 Shawn Daivari
 Mike Modest
 Wolfgang
 Ricky Marvin
 Colt Cabana
 Doug Williams
 Pac
 Neil Faith
 Justice Pain
 D'Lo Brown
 El Ligero
 Chris Sabin
 Tatanka
 Takeshi Rikio
 Dragon Kid
 CIMA
 Portia Perez
 Daizee Haze
 Zandig
 Sandman
 Kenichiro Arai
 Allison Danger
 Hannibal
 Scotty Mac
 Jessica Black
 Mad Man Manson
 Mandrake
 Ballymun Bruiser
 Sunny
 Eddie Edwards
 Vince Russo
 Domino
 Sheamus

See also

List of professional wrestling promotions in Europe

References

Further reading

External links
 

Irish professional wrestling promotions
2002 establishments in Ireland
Entertainment companies established in 2002